Omorgus mentitor is a species of hide beetle in the subfamily Omorginae.

References

mentitor
Beetles described in 1896